Carl Pauen (7 April 1859 – 7 June 1935) was a German modern pentathlete. He competed at the 1912 Summer Olympics.

References

1859 births
1935 deaths
German male modern pentathletes
Olympic modern pentathletes of Germany
Modern pentathletes at the 1912 Summer Olympics
Sportspeople from Mönchengladbach